Brett Halford (born 19 June 1971) is a Zimbabwean backstroke swimmer. He competed in two events at the 1988 Summer Olympics.

References

External links
 

1971 births
Living people
Zimbabwean male backstroke swimmers
Olympic swimmers of Zimbabwe
Swimmers at the 1988 Summer Olympics
Commonwealth Games competitors for Zimbabwe
Swimmers at the 1994 Commonwealth Games
African Games bronze medalists for Zimbabwe
African Games medalists in swimming
Place of birth missing (living people)
Competitors at the 1991 All-Africa Games